Adhanom Abraha (born 1 June 1977) is a Swedish long-distance runner. In 2019, he competed in the men's marathon at the 2019 World Athletics Championships held in Doha, Qatar. He finished in 28th place.

In 2010, he competed in the men's half marathon at the 2010 IAAF World Half Marathon Championships held in Nanning, China. He finished in 14th place.

In 2018, he transferred from Eritrea to represent Sweden.

In 2020, he competed in the men's race at the 2020 World Athletics Half Marathon Championships held in Gdynia, Poland.

References

External links 
 

Living people
1977 births
Place of birth missing (living people)
Swedish male long-distance runners
Swedish male marathon runners
World Athletics Championships athletes for Sweden
Eritrean emigrants to Sweden